The Baluchistan pygmy jerboa (Salpingotulus michaelis) or dwarf three-toed jerboa, is a species of rodent in the family Dipodidae. It is the only species in the genus Salpingotulus. Adults average only  in head and body length, with the tail averaging . Adult females weigh . It is currently considered to be endemic to Pakistan. In the 1999 Guinness Book of Records, it was listed as tied for the smallest rodent in the world with the African pygmy mouse.

Distribution 
This little rodent species has been recorded from Pakistan and may occur in Afghanistan. It frequents sand dunes, gravel flats and plains in hot deserts.

Ecology 
These nocturnal jerboas move through its dry desert habitat in long hops, balancing with the tail. They live in burrows generally excavated under small bushes. They feed on wind blown seeds and succulent leaves of desert-adapted vegetation; food is raised to the mouth using the hands. They undergo a diurnal rhythm of physiological dormancy, when their bodily functions, including respiration and blood circulation, slow down dramatically. This is known as facultative hypothermia and enables the species to survive on a diet of low nutritional value. Two to four young, blind and naked at birth, are born in the spring and summer months. No more than 2 litters a year are normally produced.

Predators 
The natural predators of the jerboa are the leaf-nosed viper (Eristocophis mcmahoni), the trans-Caspian monitor lizard (Varanus caspius), and the sand cat (Felis margarita).

References

Baluchistan pygmy jerboa
Mammals of Pakistan
Endemic fauna of Pakistan
Taxonomy articles created by Polbot
Baluchistan pygmy jerboa